Blackshaw is a surname. Notable people with the surname include:

Alan Blackshaw (1933–2011), English mountaineer, skier and civil servant
Andrew Blackshaw (born 1990), Australian softball player
Basil Blackshaw (1932–2016), Northern Ireland artist
Bill Blackshaw (1920–1994), English footballer
Christian Blackshaw (born 1949), British classical pianist
James Blackshaw (born 1981), English musician
Niamh Blackshaw (born 1999), English actress